Amnion nodosum are nodules found on the amnion, and is frequently present in oligohydramnios.  The nodules are composed of squamous cell aggregates derived from the vernix caseosa on the fetal skin.
Amnion nodosum is caused by the unexpected abrasion of amnion with depositions of the fetal surface cells and acellular debris on the eroded areas(due to moderate or severe oligohydramnios, the amnion can get "touch" with the fetal skin). Amnion nodosum and oligohydramnios are associated with pulmonary hypoplasia and renal agenesis. Amnion nodosum is granules on amnion whereas whitish nodules on the cord suggest a candidal infection.

References

Embryology